Francisco Camilo (Madrid 1610–Madrid 1671) was a Spanish painter, the son of an Italian immigrant who had settled in Madrid.  When his father died, his mother remarried, and Camilo became the stepson of the painter Pedro de las Cuevas.

De las Cuevas brought Camilo up as his own son, teaching him to paint. At the age of 18, Camilo was asked to paint for the high altar of the Jesuits’ house at Madrid an image representing St. Francis Borgia (which was afterwards removed to make way for an altarpiece in plastic).

The Count-Duke of Olivares ordered Camilo to produce a series of paintings of Kings of Spain for the theater of Buenretiro. The Count-Duke also chose Camilo to adorn the western gallery of the palace with 14 frescoes from Ovid's Metamorphoses. Primarily a painter of religious works, Camilo painted for the monasteries of Madrid, Toledo, Alcalá, and Segovia.  He painted and draped some of the statuary of Manuel Pereyra.

Works

Scenes from Ovid's Metamorphoses (1641), Alcázar de Madrid, now destroyed
San Juan de Dios (1650), Bowes Museum, Barnard Castle, Durham, England
Saint Louis of France (1651), Sarasota Museum
San Jerónimo azotado por los ángeles (1651), Museo del Prado, Madrid
Martyr of Saint Bartholomew (1651), Museo del Prado
Adoration of the Kings (Museo de Bellas Artes, Bilba)
San Carlos Borromeo y los apestados, the New Cathedral of Salamanca
San Pedro consagrando a San Torcuato, Hospital Tavera, Toledo
San José con el Niño dormido, Huesca Museum
Altarpiece of Santorcaz (Madrid) (1656)
Altarpiece of Otero de Herreros (1659), Segovia
Altarpiece of the Virgin of Fuencisla (1662), Segovia
Conversion of Saint Paul, Provincial Museum, Segovia
Muerte de San Pablo Ermitaño, Museo del Prado
San Juan Bautista en orla de flores, private collection
Asunción de la Virgen (1666), Hermitage Museum, Saint Petersburg
Adoration of the Shepherds, Chazen Museum of Art, Madison, Wisconsin
Statuary of Manuel Pereyra
 Ascension, (1651), Museu Nacional d´Art de Catalunya

Notes

Bibliography
García López, David (2008). Lázaro Díaz del Valle y las Vidas de pintores de España. Madrid, Fundación Universitaria Española., p. 310 .
Palomino, Antonio, An account of the lives and works of the most eminent Spanish painters, sculptors and architects, 1724, first English translation, 1739, p. 83
Palomino, Antonio (1988). El museo pictórico y escala óptica III. El parnaso español pintoresco laureado. Madrid, Aguilar S.A. de Ediciones., p. 323 .
Pérez Sánchez, Alonso E., Baroque Paintings in Spain, 1600–1750 (Pintura Barroca en España, 1600–1750). Ed. Cátedra, Madrid (2009), 5th ed., 
Various authors, Prefiguración Del Museu Nacional D'Art de Catalunya, Ed. Museu Nacional d'Art de Catalunya (1992) 
Tabar Anitua, Fernando, "New attributions to Francisco Camilo and Francisco Herranz" ("Nuevas atribuciones a Francisco Camilo y Francisco Herranz, seguidor segoviano"), Spanish Arts Archive, Vol. 66, no. 263, 1993, p. 291–296.

External links

 Francisco Camilo at the Museo del Prado Online Encyclopedia 
 Digital works of Francisco Camilo at the Biblioteca Digital Hispánica at the National Library of Spain 

17th-century Spanish painters
Spanish male painters
1610 births
1671 deaths
People from Madrid
Fresco painters